Joel Shew (November 13, 1816 - October 6, 1855) was an American physician, hydrotherapist and natural hygiene advocate.

Biography

Shew was born in Providence, Saratoga County. He worked in a daguerreotype shop in Philadelphia and obtained his medical degree in 1843. Shew took interest in hydrotherapy and visited Gräfenberg to study Vincenz Priessnitz's techniques. His wife, Marie Louise Shew was also a hydrotherapist. They were friends of Mary Gove Nichols who had temporary lodged at their house. The Shews operated a "water-cure" house and opened it to patients.

In 1844, Shew established the first water-cure institution in New York City. In May 1845, he opened the New Lebanon Springs Water-Cure Establishment which cost about $3,000. He was the co-owner and advising physician. David Campbell was its manager for ten years. Shew was influenced by the dieting ideas of Sylvester Graham and promoted natural hygiene practices such as bathing, exercise and massage as well as the  elimination of alcohol and tobacco. Historian Stephen Nissenbaum has noted "it is clear that Shew was a Grahamite before he discovered the water-cure". Shew and his wife were vegetarian. 

In 1850, Shew wrote notes and additions for the American edition of William Lambe's Water and Vegetable Diet. He died at Oyster Bay, Long Island. An autopsy revealed an enlarged liver and internal lesions. This may have been the result of Shew's exposure to chemicals during his earlier career as a photographer.

The Water-Cure Journal

In 1845, Shew launched The Water-Cure Journal. After 1850, it had a subscription list of 50,000. Russell Trall edited the journal from 1849 and it was later renamed, The Herald of Health.

Selected publications

Facts in Hydropathy or Water Cure (1844)
Water-Cure for Ladies (Marie Louise Shew, revised by Joel Shew, 1844)
Hydropathy, Or, The Water-Cure (1845)
The Water-Cure Manual (1847)
Tobacco: Its History, Nature, and Effects on the Body and Mind (1849)
Water and Vegetable Diet (William Lambe, notes and additions by Joel Shew, 1850)
Consumption: Its Prevention and Cure by the Water Treatment (1851)
The Hydropathic Family Physician (1854)

References

External links
Works by Joel Shew at Internet Archive

1816 births
1855 deaths
American health and wellness writers
American vegetarianism activists
Hydrotherapists
Orthopaths
People from Saratoga County, New York